Edi Kurnia (born October 2, 1983) is an Indonesian footballer who currently plays for Pelita Bandung Raya in the Indonesia Super League.

Club statistics

References

External links

1983 births
Association football goalkeepers
Living people
People from Bogor
Indonesian footballers
Liga 1 (Indonesia) players
Bontang F.C. players
Persib Bandung players
PSMS Medan players
Indonesian Premier Division players
Persikabo Bogor players
Pelita Bandung Raya players
Sportspeople from West Java